The 2016 Everest Premier League was the debut season of the Everest Premier League. It was supposed to be the second edition of the Nepal Premier League, abbreviated as NPL, and was scheduled to be held from 26 March to 4 April 2015 in Kirtipur. but Cricket Association of Nepal insisted that it will not support the tournament unless its name is changed. Later, the board decided to uphold the tournament as the name was changed to Everest Premier League and provided the ground for competition. The tournament began on 24 September and ended on 3 October 2016.

The title was won by Panchakanya Tej, who defeated Colors X-Factors by 40 runs in the final. Sompal Kami of Jagadamba Rhinos was player of the tournament.

Teams 
Six franchise teams were formed under the names of corporate houses. The list of the teams and their players are listed below:

Teams and standings

Points table

 advanced to the Final

League progression

Fixtures 
All times are Nepal Standard Time (UTC+05:45)

League stage

Final

Statistics

Most runs

Most wickets

References

External links 
 Cricketing Nepal

Everest Premier League
2016 in Nepalese cricket